José Barros Silva (born 26 December 1973, in Praia), known as Zé Piguita, is a Cape Verdean retired footballer who played as a defender.

His first club was ADESBA of the Santiago Island League in which he played from 1999 until 2002. He later played in France with ES Wasquehal for a season. He was then one of the first players and defenders of any team in the Middle East, all of them in Qatar, first with al-Ahli of Doha from 2003 to 2005 then al Shamal for three seasons until 2008.

He returned to Cape Verde and in 2013 became assistant coach for Sporting Clube da Praia for a season.  A year later he became coach of Académica da Praia until 2016.

External links

1973 births
Living people
Sportspeople from Praia
Cape Verdean footballers
Association football defenders
AD Bairro players
Santiago South Premier Division players
Qatar Stars League players
Al Ahli SC (Doha) players
Al-Shamal SC players
Cape Verde international footballers
Cape Verdean expatriate footballers
Expatriate footballers in France
Expatriate footballers in Qatar
Cape Verdean football managers
Académica da Praia
Sporting Clube da Praia
Wasquehal Football players